Nathan Benjamin Aké (born 18 February 1995) is a Dutch professional footballer who plays as a defender for Premier League club Manchester City and the Netherlands national team. Although he predominantly plays as a centre-back, he has also been deployed as a left-back.

Club career

Chelsea

Early career
Aké agreed to join the Chelsea youth system from Feyenoord in 2010 at age 15. He had played at Feyenoord since age 12 after joining the club from ADO Den Haag.

Aké made his Premier League debut on 26 December 2012 against Norwich City as a 17-year-old, replacing Juan Mata in added time at the end of a 1–0 win at Carrow Road. He made his first start for the club in the FA Cup on 27 February 2013 in a 2–0 win against Championship team Middlesbrough. He was chosen to start in a defensive midfield position for Chelsea in the second leg of their UEFA Europa League quarter-final clash with Rubin Kazan in Russia on 11 April, a match that finished in a 3–2 loss but resulted in a 5–4 aggregate victory. Aké was an unused substitute for Chelsea in the Europa League final against Benfica at the Amsterdam Arena on 16 May, which Chelsea won 2–1. He was voted Chelsea's Young Player of the Year on 16 May, and made his first Premier League start three days later in the 2–1 win against Everton at Stamford Bridge on the last matchday of the season.

On 8 August 2013, Aké signed a new five-year contract with Chelsea, lasting until 2018. Following his permanent promotion to the first team, on 21 October 2014, Aké made his UEFA Champions League debut from the substitutes' bench, coming into the match for Cesc Fàbregas in the 60th minute during a 6–0 home win over Maribor, and provided an assist for Eden Hazard's second goal.

Loan spells

On 25 March 2015, Aké was loaned to Championship club Reading for one month, making his first of five appearances against Cardiff City in a 1–1 draw ten days later. Although he only made one league appearance for Chelsea the entire season, as a substitute in a 3–0 loss at West Bromwich Albion on 18 May, manager José Mourinho said Aké would receive a winner's medal for his contribution to the team that season.

On 14 August 2015, Aké completed a season-long loan move to newly promoted Premier League club Watford, after having signed a new five-year contract with Chelsea. Eleven days later, he made his debut for the Hornets in a League Cup second round match against Preston North End, which ended in a 1–0 defeat for his team. Aké played his first Premier League match coming off the substitutes' bench against Newcastle United 19 September 2015, helping Watford hold on for a 2–1 win. He scored his first senior goal on 20 December, opening a 3–0 win over Liverpool at Vicarage Road in the fourth minute, after goalkeeper Ádám Bogdán dropped a corner kick.

During his time with the Hertfordshire side, manager Quique Sánchez Flores primarily deployed Aké as a left-back. His performance and work ethic earned him Watford's Young Player of the Season award.

On 29 June 2016, Aké joined AFC Bournemouth on loan for the 2016–17 season. On 21 August, he made his Bournemouth debut in a 1–0 away defeat against West Ham United, replacing Jordon Ibe following teammate Harry Arter's dismissal after a challenge on Cheikhou Kouyaté. Following the defeat to West Ham, Aké made his full debut against Morecambe in the second round of the EFL Cup on 24 August. On 19 November, in his first Premier League start, Aké scored his first goal for Bournemouth in a 1–0 away victory over Stoke City.

On 4 December 2016, Bournemouth played Liverpool and overturned a 3–1 deficit with 15 minutes to go to win the match 4–3; Aké scoring the winning goal in the 93rd minute, his third Premier League goal and the second against Liverpool.

Return to Chelsea
Aké was recalled by Chelsea on 8 January 2017, making his first appearance for the club since the recall on 28 January in a 4–0 FA Cup fourth round victory over fellow West London club Brentford. He was also selected to start in Chelsea's 2–0 win over Wolverhampton Wanderers in the fifth round of the same competition on 18 February.

On 22 April 2017, Aké started alongside David Luiz and César Azpilicueta in central defence in Chelsea's 4–2 FA Cup semi-final victory over rivals Tottenham Hotspur at Wembley Stadium.

AFC Bournemouth
On 30 June 2017, Aké signed a contract with Premier League club Bournemouth on a permanent basis for a club record of £20 million transfer fee, with the player officially re-joining the club the following day, when the 2017 transfer window opened. On 21 July, it was reported his former club Chelsea had inserted a buy-back clause for Aké in his transfer contract.

Manchester City
On 5 August 2020, Aké signed for Manchester City, on a five-year deal.

Aké started and debuted in City's first game of the season on 21 September, winning 3–1 against Wolverhampton Wanderers away from home in the Premier League. On 27 September 2020, he scored his first goal for City in a 2–5 home defeat against Leicester City. On 3 November 2020, Aké made his Champions League debut for City in a 3–0 home win over Olympiacos in the group stage.

Aké scored his first Champions League goal on 15 September 2021 in a 6–3 win against RB Leipzig. He revealed afterwards that his father, who had been terminally ill, had died shortly after the goal.

International career
Aké has represented the Netherlands at every youth level since his under-15 debut in 2009, making 54 appearances in total. He has captained both the U17 and the U19 teams. Aké was selected into both squads that won the UEFA European Under-17 Championships in 2011 and 2012 in Serbia and in Slovenia, respectively.

Aké was also eligible to represent the Ivory Coast through his father Moise.

Aké made his senior international debut in 2017 in a friendly against Morocco, who were beaten 1–2 by the Netherlands.

Style of play
Aké has been praised for his versatility, good passing range, reading the game quite well, being able to play at both full-back, centre-back and in defensive midfield, which has been attributed to a good work ethic, professionalism and gifted technique. His calmness on the ball and appearance have led to comparisons to former Dutch legend and Chelsea player Ruud Gullit.

Personal life
Aké was born in The Hague, South Holland. His father, Moise Ake, is from the Ivory Coast, while his mother Ineke Telder, is Dutch. Aké is a teetotaller.

Career statistics

Club

International

Netherlands score listed first, score column indicates score after each Aké goal.

Honours
Chelsea
Football League Cup: 2014–15
UEFA Europa League: 2012–13
FA Cup runner-up: 2016–17

Manchester City
Premier League: 2020–21, 2021–22
EFL Cup: 2020–21
UEFA Champions League runner-up: 2020–21

Netherlands U17
UEFA European Under-17 Championship: 2011, 2012

Individual
Chelsea Young Player of the Year: 2012–13
Watford Young Player of the Season: 2015–16
AFC Bournemouth Supporters Player of the Season: 2017–18

References

External links

Chelsea F.C. profile

Netherlands stats at OnsOranje 

1995 births
Living people
Footballers from The Hague
Dutch footballers
Association football defenders
Association football midfielders
Chelsea F.C. players
Reading F.C. players
Watford F.C. players
AFC Bournemouth players
Manchester City F.C. players
Premier League players
English Football League players
UEFA Europa League winning players
Netherlands youth international footballers
Netherlands under-21 international footballers
Netherlands international footballers
UEFA Euro 2020 players
2022 FIFA World Cup players
Dutch expatriate footballers
Expatriate footballers in England
Dutch expatriate sportspeople in England
Dutch people of Ivorian descent